A stanchion is a sturdy upright fixture that provides support for some other object. It can be a permanent fixture.

Types

In architecture stanchions are the upright iron bars in windows that pass through the eyes of the saddle bars or horizontal irons to steady the leadlight. The French call the latter traverses, the stanchions montants, and the whole arrangement armature. Stanchions frequently finish with ornamental heads forged out of the iron.

Stanchions are also the metal supporting members of lighting mounted from a lower elevation. This includes the metal inclined member for mounting a streetlight to a telephone or power pole, and the dedicated metal vertical support of a self-supporting or bottom-fed streetlight. In this case, the stanchion pole may double as the raceway for the electrical feed to the lighting.

In industrial installations, walkway lighting may be mounted with a stanchion that is secured to a hand-rail. Stanchion lights are typically spaced 50' along walkways, such as conveyor platforms.

Stanchions (balusters or bollards) are also the upright posts inserted into the ground or floor to protect the corner of a wall.

In event management a stanchion is an upright bar or post that includes retractable belts, velvet ropes, or plastic chains, sometimes in conjunction with wall-mounted barrier devices, barricades, and printed signage and often used for crowd control and engineering people flow and construction site safety.

Uses

Stanchions are used for many different purposes, including crowd control and waiting lines. Many different places use stanchions, including banks, stores, hotels, museums, restaurants, concert venues, trade shows, and other events.
 Portable posts used to manage lines and queues.
 Fixed posts with decorative ropes, custom printed belts, or metal wires. Often available in single, double, and triple belt/wire configurations.
 Retractable belt stanchions, often with a slow retract belt mechanism for safety.
 Using a spring mechanism
 Often using a heavy low-profile base to offset possible trip hazard and stanchion tipping.
 In museums, stanchions are used to protect items, and remind the person that the items are not to be touched.
 Belt end types differ between models unless supplied with a "Universal Belt End", allowing for connectivity between multiple brands.

 Around construction work sites where hazardous areas need to be clearly marked. Stanchions used for this purpose are usually seen in bright safety colors, like orange or yellow, and often come with attachments for safety signs, warning passersby of the danger in the area.
 Retracting belt barriers affixed to traffic cones with reflective print.
 Vertical support for chains or ropes, as in marine applications (lifelines on yachts are supported by stanchions).
 Metal mounts securing the headrest to the seat in a car.
 In association football and other goal-based sports, horizontal or diagonal extensions to the goalposts that prevent the goalnet from drooping.
 In military aircraft, the vertical supports for troop seating temporarily installed in cargo aircraft.
 On board most buses and trams/subways, vertical supports to provide stability when passengers are standing. They are located throughout most city buses and are connected to seats, floor, roof, etc.
 The metal head bails in dairy barns that lock the cows in place while they are milked.
 The two upper members of a suspension bicycle fork that connect to the crown (also called fork legs).
 In yachting, metal bars that hold the life-lines around a boat's perimeter.
 In river rafting, metal bars that hold the yokes for oars.
 A common vernacular in ice hockey where on the dasher boards it is used to describe the posts used to hold panes of glass in place. In the industry they are simply called posts.
 The upright part of the frame around a windscreen (the A pillar).

Side stakes 
 Short or tall, removable, stanchions in pockets on flatcars or flat wagons
 Short or tall, removable, stanchions in pockets on flatbed trucks or flatbed semi-trailers

See also 
 Bollard
 Buttress
 Column
 Steel fence post

References

Windows
Association football terminology